Jakub Klepiš (born June 5, 1984) is a Czech professional ice hockey player currently playing for BK Mladá Boleslav of the Czech Extraliga (EHL).

Playing career
Klepiš was drafted in the first round, 16th overall by the Ottawa Senators in the 2002 NHL Entry Draft. Before ever playing for Ottawa, Klepiš was traded to the Buffalo Sabres in 2003 in a deal that sent Vaclav Varada to the Senators. Before ever playing for the Sabres, he was dealt to the Washington Capitals on March 9, 2004 in exchange for forward Mike Grier.

Klepiš ultimately played in 66 NHL games (all with the Capitals) before returning to Europe to continue his professional career in the Kontinental Hockey League.

He won the Gagarin Cup in 2012 with Dynamo Moscow, scoring the series-winning goal in the seventh game.

On June 26, 2014, he left HC Lev Praha after two seasons to join Swedish club,  Färjestad BK of the SHL. He then returned to the Czech Republic joining HC Oceláři Třinec before moving to his current club, BK Mladá Boleslav, part way through the 2015/2016 league season.

International play

Klepiš played his first game for the national team in 2004, and has played 4 World Championships for the Czech national team  culminating in a gold medal win in the 2010 World Championships.

Career statistics

Regular season and playoffs

International

References

External links

 
 

1984 births
Avangard Omsk players
Czech ice hockey centres
HC Dynamo Moscow players
HC Lev Praha players
HC Slavia Praha players
Hershey Bears players
Living people
National Hockey League first-round draft picks
Ottawa Senators draft picks
Portland Pirates players
Portland Winterhawks players
Ice hockey people from Prague
Washington Capitals players
Czech expatriate ice hockey players in Russia
Czech expatriate ice hockey players in the United States
Czech expatriate ice hockey players in Sweden